C. glaucus may refer to:
 Callistemon glaucus, a shrub in the myrtle family
 Caulanthus glaucus, a plant in the mustard family
 Chiton glaucus, the green chiton
 Coluber glaucus, now Bothrops lanceolatus, the fer-de-lance snake
 Conus glaucus, a species of cone snail
 Craugastor glaucus, a species of frog

See also
 Glaucus (disambiguation)